The John Halloran House is a historic house at 99 E. Squantum Street in Quincy, Massachusetts.  This two-family wood-frame house was built in 1910 for John Halloran, a local police officer.  It is a well-preserved Colonial Revival example of duplexes that were commonly built in the Atlantic neighborhood of Quincy, with a fine balustraded porch, and an entrance with long sidelight windows and oval window in the door.  Bay windows project on the right side of the front, and a low hip-roof dormer projects from the roof.

The house was listed on the National Register of Historic Places in 1989.

See also
National Register of Historic Places listings in Quincy, Massachusetts

References

Colonial Revival architecture in Massachusetts
Houses completed in 1910
Houses in Quincy, Massachusetts
National Register of Historic Places in Quincy, Massachusetts
Houses on the National Register of Historic Places in Norfolk County, Massachusetts
1910 establishments in Massachusetts